James Seward [Westy] (born 4 September 1997) is an English cricketer. He made his first-class debut on 1 April 2018 for Oxford MCCU against Kent as part of the Marylebone Cricket Club University fixtures.

References

External links
 

1997 births
Living people
English cricketers
Oxford MCCU cricketers
Cheshire cricketers